Honoré Jean Pierre Fisquet (1818–1883) was a French historian, biographer and writer of guide books, including a Nouveau guide général du voyageur en Angleterre, en Écosse et en Irlande (1864), which he wrote together with Henri-Marie Martin and published under the pseudonym William Darcy. He was born in Montpellier on 16 June 1818 and died in Paris on 27 July 1883.

Publications
He was best known for his 22-volume biographical overview of French bishops, La France pontificale (Gallia Christiana), published in large part by Étienne Repos in 1864–1872. His other works include:
 Ode à la France sur le retour des cendres de Napoléon (1840)
 Histoire de l'Algérie depuis les temps anciens jusqu'à nos jours (1842)
 Un premier amour (1845)
 La Nouvelle Marseillaise (1848)
 Biographie des membres du Gouvernement provisoire (1848)
 Guide du visiteur: Histoire archéologique et descriptive des églises de Paris (1855)
 Notice sur le P. Jérôme Natalis (1856)
 Notice biographique sur monseigneur Marie-Gaston de Bonnechose, Cardinal-archevêque de Rouen (1865)
 Notice biographique sur monseigneur Sébastien Adolphe Devoucoux, évêque d'Evreux (1865)
 Notice biographique sur son éminence Thomas Gousset, cardinal archevêque de Reims (1865)
 Les pères du Concile, biographies, portraits et autographes des pères du concile premier du Vatican (1871)
 Cérémonies pontificales: Histoire liturgique et descriptive des chapelles papales tenues pendant l'année dans les diverses églises de Rome (1871)
 Biographie de monseigneur Georges Darboy, archevêque de Paris (1871)
 Rome et l'épiscopat catholique (1874)
 La France départementale, histoire générale de toutes les communes (1875)
 Grand atlas départemental de la France, de l'Algérie et des colonies (1878)
 Dictionnaire des célébrités de France classées par ordre alphabétique et par départements (1878)
Histoire archéologique et descriptive de Notre-Dame de Paris (undated)

References

1818 births
1883 deaths
Writers from Montpellier
19th-century French non-fiction writers
French male non-fiction writers